John Alexander Creaney, QC, TA, OBE, DL (29 July 1933 – 3 June 2008) was a Northern Ireland QC, later named Senior Prosecuting Counsel at Belfast Crown Court, beginning in 1978.

Creaney was born in Armagh City, County Armagh to a World War II veteran father  who worked as a bus driver. Creaney attended the Royal School, Armagh and Queen's University, Belfast (QUB). He followed in his father's footsteps by joining the Territorial Army's Officer Training Corps (OTC). Creaney helped raise the RIR 5th Battalion for NATO service, keeping the soldiers for the most part out of The Troubles, although Creaney himself was intimidated from his home in South Belfast due to threats from both republican and loyalist paramilitaries, beginning in the 1970s.

Legal career
Creaney was a pupil of Basil Kelly and began his legal career in 1957, after being called to the Bar. In 1968, he was appointed Junior Crown Counsel for County Antrim, and was named a QC five years later, taking silk in 1973. 

In the latter part of his career, Creaney became the resident Senior Prosecuting Counsel appearing for the Crown instructed by the NI DPP (now PPS) in trials held at Crumlin road Courthouse, Belfast. Creaney was very successful, rarely losing a case and was highly respected by both prosecution and defence.

Cases
Creaney oversaw or worked on numerous notable trials/prosecutions, including the following:
 1966: Malvern Street killings
 1991: Danny Morrison (Irish republican)
 1992: Brian Nelson (Northern Irish loyalist)
 1996 John Torney  - Policeman accused of murder of his wife, son and daughter.  Torney's case was that his son had committed the murders then killed himself. Torney died in prison after conviction and the loss of an appeal to the Belfast High Court, still protesting his innocence.
 2005: Abbas Boutrab case, Northern Ireland's first al-Qa'eda-related trial

Deputy Lieutenancy
He later served as a Deputy Lieutenant of County Down.

Personal life/death
In 1957, he married Evelyn McCormack; the couple had three daughters. Creaney died at his home in Cultra in 2008, aged 74, from leukaemia.

References

1933 births
2008 deaths
People from County Armagh
People from County Down
20th-century King's Counsel
21st-century King's Counsel
Officers of the Order of the British Empire
Deaths from cancer in Northern Ireland
Deaths from leukemia
Deputy Lieutenants of Down
Alumni of Queen's University Belfast